Psiloochyrocera is a genus of spiders in the family Ochyroceratidae. It was first described in 2014 by Baert. , it contains 2 species, both found in Ecuador.

References

Ochyroceratidae
Araneomorphae genera
Spiders of South America